Bryonympha is a monotypic moth genus in the family Immidae. Its only species, Bryonympha silvana, is found on Grande Comore of the Comoros in the Mozambique Channel off the eastern coast of Africa. Both the genus and species were first described by Edward Meyrick in 1930.

References

Immidae
Moths described in 1930
Monotypic moth genera
Moths of Africa